Margarita Sergeyevna Chernousova (née Lomova; born 24 March 1996) is a Russian sport shooter.

She participated at the 2018 ISSF World Shooting Championships, winning a medal.

References

External links

Living people
1996 births
Russian female sport shooters
ISSF pistol shooters
People from Novokuznetsk
Shooters at the 2014 Summer Youth Olympics
Shooters at the 2019 European Games
European Games medalists in shooting
European Games gold medalists for Russia
Shooters at the 2020 Summer Olympics
Sportspeople from Kemerovo Oblast
21st-century Russian women